A. W. Gribble Farm, also known as Deerwood Farm, is a historic house and farm located near Pisgah, Preston County, West Virginia. The house was built about 1842, and is a -story, five bay, side gabled, I house.  It is built from square cut, regular coursed sandstone and measures 24 feet by 36 feet.  Also on the property are a two-story springhouse (c. 1842), pantry building (c. 1842), and barn (c. 1870).

It was listed on the National Register of Historic Places in 2009.

References

Houses on the National Register of Historic Places in West Virginia
Houses completed in 1842
Houses in Preston County, West Virginia
National Register of Historic Places in Preston County, West Virginia
Farms on the National Register of Historic Places in West Virginia
I-houses in West Virginia
Stone houses in West Virginia